Frane Čirjak (born 23 June 1995) is a Croatian professional footballer who plays as a midfielder for Sarajevo.

Honours
Zrinjski Mostar
Bosnian Premier League: 2017–18

References

External links
 

1995 births
Living people
Sportspeople from Zadar
Association football midfielders
Croatian footballers
Croatia youth international footballers
NK Zadar players
FC Luzern players
NK Zagreb players
HŠK Zrinjski Mostar players
FC Lviv players
FC Lokomotiv 1929 Sofia players
Croatian Football League players
Swiss Super League players
Premier League of Bosnia and Herzegovina players
Ukrainian Premier League players
Croatian expatriate footballers
Expatriate footballers in Switzerland
Croatian expatriate sportspeople in Switzerland
Expatriate footballers in Bosnia and Herzegovina
Croatian expatriate sportspeople in Bosnia and Herzegovina
Expatriate footballers in Ukraine
Croatian expatriate sportspeople in Ukraine
Expatriate footballers in Bulgaria
Croatian expatriate sportspeople in Bulgaria